Benton Township is the name of two townships in the U.S. state of Indiana:

 Benton Township, Elkhart County, Indiana
 Benton Township, Monroe County, Indiana

See also 
 Benton Township (disambiguation)

Indiana township disambiguation pages